The 5000 metres speed skating event was part of the speed skating at the 1952 Winter Olympics programme. The competition was held on Sunday, 17 February 1952, at 4p.m. Thirty-five speed skaters from 13 nations competed.

Medalists

Records
These were the standing world and Olympic records (in minutes) prior to the 1952 Winter Olympics.

(*) The record was set on naturally frozen ice.

(**) This record was not recognized before the 1955 ISU Congress. It was set in a high altitude venue (more than 1000 metres above sea level) and on naturally frozen ice.

Hjalmar Andersen set a new Olympic record with 8:10.6 minutes.

Results

Nikolay Mamonov who set a faster time than the standing world record (later recognized as world record) did not compete as the Soviet Union did not participate in Winter Games before 1956.

References

External links
Official Olympic Report
 

Speed skating at the 1952 Winter Olympics